Binayak may refer to:

Binayak Sen
Ganesha
Binayak, Nepal